In Greek myth, dragon's teeth (odontes (tou) drakontos) feature prominently in the legends of the Phoenician prince Cadmus and in Jason's quest for the Golden Fleece. In each case, the dragons are present and breathe fire. Their teeth, once planted, would grow into fully armed warriors.

Cadmus, the bringer of literacy and civilization, killed the sacred dragon that guarded the spring of Ares. The goddess Athena told him to sow the teeth, from which sprang a group of ferocious warriors called the spartoi. He threw a precious jewel into the midst of the warriors, who turned on each other in an attempt to seize the stone for themselves. The five survivors joined with Cadmus to found the city of Thebes.

Similarly, Jason was challenged by King Aeëtes of Colchis to sow dragon's teeth from Athena in order to obtain the Golden Fleece. Medea, Aeëtes' daughter, advised Jason to throw a stone between the warriors that sprang from the earth. The warriors started fighting and killing each other, leaving no survivor but Jason.

The classical legends of Cadmus and Jason have given rise to the phrase "to sow dragon's teeth". This is used as a metaphor to refer to doing something that has the effect of fomenting disputes.

Gallery

References

Greek dragons
Greek mythology